Samuel D. Wonders (1890–1980) was an American consulting engineer and ink manufacturer who served as president of the Carter's Ink Company, in Cambridge, Massachusetts from 1949 to 1955.

Early life and education
Samuel Driscoll Wonders was born on July 30, 1890 in Bellefontaine, Ohio, the son of James Crewe Wonders and Nancybelle (Spellman) Wonders. He attended the University of Wisconsin–Madison and received a Bachelor of Science in 1913.

Career
From 1913-1929, Samuel D. Wonders worked as an industrial engineer for various companies in Ohio and Massachusetts, the best known of which was Firestone Tire and Rubber Company.

Carter's Ink 
Samuel D. Wonders went to work for Carter's Ink in 1929 as an industrial engineer and was elected to the board and became general manager in 1935. He was elected president in 1949 after the death of president Richard B. Carter and served until 1955.

Later career 
Starting in 1955, he worked as a consulting industrial engineer. He became a trustee of Lesley College in Cambridge in 1955 and was elected chairman of the board in 1963 and was acting president of the college from 1959 to 1960.

Personal life
On October 20, 1920, Wonders married Dixie Ward Braley. After he joined Carter's Ink in 1929, they lived in Watertown, Massachusetts. They later moved to Peterborough, New Hampshire.

Death 
Samuel D. Wonders died in October 1920 in Peterborough, New Hampshire.

References

1890 births
1980 deaths
People from Bellefontaine, Ohio
Fountain pen and ink manufacturers
Engineers from Ohio
University of Wisconsin–Madison alumni
20th-century American businesspeople
People from Peterborough, New Hampshire
20th-century American engineers